Autol is a village in the province and autonomous community of La Rioja, Spain. 
River Cidacos flows by the town. There are original rock formations close to Autol.

Notable people 
 Abilio Martínez Varea: Bishop of Osma-Soria.
 Javier Herreros: Spanish professional footballer.

References

External links

 Ayuntamiento de Autol
 Autol, Rioja 
 Cofradia del Santísimo - Autol

Populated places in La Rioja (Spain)